Henning Lynge Jakobsen (born March 6, 1962) is a Danish sprint canoer who competed in the mid-1980s. He distinguished himself by winning two Olympic medals at the same Olympics at the 1984 Summer Olympics in Los Angeles, a feat that has yet to be repeated by a Dane.

References

1962 births
Canoeists at the 1984 Summer Olympics
Danish male canoeists
Living people
Olympic canoeists of Denmark
Olympic silver medalists for Denmark
Olympic bronze medalists for Denmark
Olympic medalists in canoeing

Medalists at the 1984 Summer Olympics